Sylwia Gruchała (born 6 November 1981 in Gdynia, Pomorskie) is a Polish fencer.

Biography
In the team foil she won medals at the world championships in 1998 (bronze), 1999 (silver), 2002 (silver), 2003 (gold) and 2007 (gold) as well as an Olympic silver medal in 2000. In Individual Foil she won a silver medal at the 2003 World Championship as well as an Olympic bronze medal in 2004.

She is a soldier in the 3rd Command Support Battalion of the Polish Land Forces stationed in Warsaw.
Gruchała is also part of the Leon Paul team. In 2009, she posed for Polish erotic magazine CKM.

Honours
For her sport achievements, she received:

 Golden Cross of Merit in 2000; 
 Knight's Cross of the Order of Polonia Restituta (5th Class) in 2004.

References

External links
Sylwia Gruchała Webpage
 
 

1981 births
Living people
Polish female foil fencers
Fencers at the 2000 Summer Olympics
Fencers at the 2004 Summer Olympics
Fencers at the 2008 Summer Olympics
Fencers at the 2012 Summer Olympics
Olympic fencers of Poland
Olympic silver medalists for Poland
Olympic bronze medalists for Poland
Sportspeople from Gdańsk
Olympic medalists in fencing
Knights of the Order of Polonia Restituta
Recipients of the Gold Cross of Merit (Poland)
Medalists at the 2000 Summer Olympics
Medalists at the 2004 Summer Olympics